Wilfred Albert Dickeson (born 18 August 1943) is a former Australian rules footballer who played with Richmond in the Victorian Football League (VFL).

Notes

External links 

Living people
1943 births

Australian rules footballers from Victoria (Australia)
Richmond Football Club players
Nhill Football Club players
Prahran Football Club players